Top Secret Spies (German name: Heimlich & Co.) is a spy-themed German-style board game designed by Wolfgang Kramer and published in 1984 by Ravensburger.  The game, also known as Under Cover or Detective & Co, won the Spiel des Jahres award in 1986.

Gameplay 
The object of the game is to score the most points, while not revealing which colour you are until the end. It requires good bluffing and analytical skills.  7 colours are used, and there can be up to 4 "robot" colours moving around. On their turn a player rolls a die and can move any number of pieces a total number of spaces that adds up to the number on the die. This can result in a score, and the game continues until one player reaches 129+ points. At this time all players make secret guesses as to which player is which colour (gaining +5 points at the end of the game for each correct answer). The game ends when a spy reaches 142+ points, and then a winner is determined after guess points are added.

Reception 
Upon its release the game won  won the Spiel des Jahres award in 1986. It is remembered in part as the first game to feature a score track encircling the board, now a common feature in many games. In a 1990 interview, Kramer revealed that Heimlich & Co. was not one of his personal favourites.

References

External links
 

Board games introduced in 1984
Murder and mystery board games
Spiel des Jahres winners
Wolfgang Kramer games
Ravensburger games
Rio Grande Games games